Mabadin-e Olya (also Romanized as Mabādīn-e ‘Olyā) is a village in Arabkhaneh Rural District, Shusef District, Nehbandan County, South Khorasan Province, Iran. At the 2006 census, its population was 24, in 8 families.

References 

Populated places in Nehbandan County